Robert Trench may refer to:

 Robert Le Poer Trench (1811–1895), judge in Victoria, Australia
 Robert K. Trench (born 1940), American biologist